Turkish Van cat may refer to:

 Van cat, a landrace of domestic cats native to the Lake Van area of present-day Turkey, and of cultural significance to Turks, Armenians and Kurds
 Turkish Van, a British-developed formal breed of domestic cats, based on stock obtained from various places in Turkey

See also

 Turkish Angora, another formal breed of domestic cat, developed from Turkish stock